James T. Smith Jr. (born February 8, 1942) is an American politician who served as Secretary of Transportation of Maryland under Governor Martin O'Malley from 2013 to 2015. A member of the Democratic Party, he previously served as Baltimore County Executive from 2002 to 2010. He succeeded Dutch Ruppersberger who was elected to the United States House of Representatives; his successor was former County Councilman Kevin B. Kamenetz.

His political career began when he was elected to the Baltimore County Council in 1978, a position he served until he was appointed Associate Judge of the Circuit Court for Baltimore County in 1985. In 2001, Smith resigned as judge to run for County Executive.  

After two terms in office, he joined his son's Towson law firm, Smith, Gildea & Schmidt. In May 2013, he left to become Maryland secretary of transportation under Gov. Martin O'Malley. He returned to the law firm in March 2015. In December 2016, he joined the cabinet of Baltimore Mayor Catherine Pugh as chief of strategic alliances, resigning in April 2019.

He has lived in Baltimore County for his entire life. He and his wife Sandy have four children and nine grandchildren.

References

Maryland State Archives biography
Baltimore County Executive update

1942 births
Living people
State cabinet secretaries of Maryland
Baltimore County Executives
Maryland Democrats
Maryland state court judges
Wheeling University alumni